Civic Center is a train and bus station in downtown St. Louis, Missouri serving the Red and Blue lines of the St. Louis MetroLink. It is also the primary transfer station for MetroBus and a bus terminal for Madison County Transit. The station is located near Enterprise Center, home of the St. Louis Blues, Soldiers Memorial, and the Saint Louis Public Library Central Library. The station also serves the adjoining Gateway Multimodal Transportation Center which has intercity services provided by Amtrak, Greyhound, and Megabus.

On August 14, 2017, MetroBus service returned to the station after an extensive renovation of the bus station portion of Civic Center. It included multiple new bus bays, a security center, an indoor waiting area and public restrooms.

In 2018, Metro's Arts in Transit program commissioned the work Wheels by Claudia Cuesta and Bill Baker for installation at the station. The stainless steel work is a highly visible site marker that integrates the different forms of transportation at this station. Wheels minimal footprint and the inscribed poem from T.S. Eliot invite people to circle the sculpture as they read the poem, creating the fourth wheel.

Station layout
Civic Center's platform is accessed via a set of stairs and a ramp from the MetroBus transfer and another ramp from Clark Avenue.

Bus connections

MetroBus
Many MetroBus routes stop here:
 4 Natural Bridge
 10 Gravois Lindell
 11 Chippewa
 19 St. Louis Avenue
 30 Arsenal
 31 Chouteau
 32 Martin Luther King
 40 North Broadway
 41 Lee
 73 Carondelet
 74 Florissant
 94 Page
 97 Delmar
 174X Halls Ferry Express

Madison County Transit
The center is also a terminal for several bus routes of the Madison County Transit System, which serves the Metro East area of St. Louis.
 1X Riverbend Express
 5 Tri-City Regional
 14X Highland Express
 16X Edwardsville - Glen Carbon Express

References

External links
 St. Louis Metro

MetroLink stations in St. Louis
Railway stations in the United States opened in 1993
Red Line (St. Louis MetroLink)
Blue Line (St. Louis MetroLink)
Downtown West, St. Louis